Siah Rud is a city in East Azerbaijan Province, Iran.

Siah Rud or Siyahrud or Siahrud may also refer to:
 Siah Varud, Gilan province
 Shafa Rud, Gilan province
 Siah Rud Poshteh, Gilan province
 Siah Rud, Mazandaran
 Siyahvarud, Zanjan
 Siah Rud District, in East Azerbaijan Province
 Siyahrud Rural District (disambiguation)